The Los Angeles County Fire Museum is a public museum dedicated to the history of the Los Angeles County Fire Department in Los Angeles County, California. The museum has 60 antique fire engines in its collection, including fire engines from the 1860s through just-retired apparatus. Its location for public exhibits is at 16400 Bellflower Blvd, Bellflower, CA on the ground floor of the Bellflower Mayne Events Center. The Museum is open four days a week. 

The Flora Vista property is now the Museum's restoration shop. This is not open to the public.

Included in this collection are fire engines pulled to fires by men, horse drawn steam fire engines, Los Angeles County Fire Department equipment dating back to the 1920s, the "Disneyland" fire engine, Model T fire engines, and 1950s fire engines. The large collection of rigs are changed often as the Museum directors display various rigs from the shop and at South Gate.

The most famous exhibits include the featured vehicles of the fictional Fire Station 51, Squad 51 and both trucks designated Engine 51, from the 1970s television series, Emergency!.

The museum was located at 9834 Flora Vista St, Bellflower, California from 2008 to mid-2018 and now houses its public collection on the ground floor of the Mayne Events Center at 16400 Bellflower Blvd, Bellflower.

References

External links
 
 Official Facebook page

Museums in Los Angeles County, California
Firefighting museums in California